Cecil Jones Attuquayefio (18 October 1944 – 12 May 2015) was a Ghanaian football player and coach.

International career
Attuquayefio played many times for the Ghana national team and helped the team win the 1965 African Nations Cup.

Coaching career
Attuquayefio managed the Benin national team to the 2004 African Nations Cup, Hearts of Oak to the 2000 African Champions League title and the 2004 CAF Confederation Cup. He also managed Ghana's national team. In 2008–09 Attuquayefio coached Liberty Professionals F.C. and became the title coach of the Century.

Attuquayefio was named African coach of the year in 2000 after his club Accra Hearts of Oak of Ghana won the African Champions league with only one loss throughout the entire tournament (to DC Motema Pembe).

In 2015, Jones Attuquayefio died in the early hours of 12 May 2015 at the Korle Bu Teaching Hospital in Accra, Ghana's capital, from throat cancer.

References

External links

1944 births
2015 deaths
Ghanaian footballers
Ghana international footballers
1965 African Cup of Nations players
1968 African Cup of Nations players
1970 African Cup of Nations players
Africa Cup of Nations-winning players
Footballers from Accra
Okwawu United players
Ghanaian football managers
Ghana national football team managers
Benin national football team managers
Ghanaian expatriate football managers
Deaths from throat cancer
Deaths from cancer in Ghana
2004 African Cup of Nations managers
Association football forwards
Olympic footballers of Ghana
Footballers at the 1968 Summer Olympics
Accra Hearts of Oak S.C. managers
Ashanti Gold S.C. managers
Accra Great Olympics F.C. managers
Liberty Professionals F.C. managers
Ga-Adangbe people
Ghanaian expatriate sportspeople in Benin
Ghanaian expatriate sportspeople in Ivory Coast
Expatriate football managers in Benin
Expatriate football managers in Ivory Coast